Dream Police is an American comic book one-shot created by writer J. Michael Straczynski with artwork by Mike Deodato.

It was published by Marvel Comics, on June 22, 2005, under their Icon imprint for creator-owned titles.

Story
Straczynski calls it "Dragnet in the Dreamscape". In the near future Detectives Joe Thursday and Frank Stafford patrol the dreamscape, a surreal landscape in Los Angeles.

Sequel
A new series was published by Image Comics from 2014 to 2016 and included another major character, Dream Detective Policewoman Kate Black.

References

External links
JMS: Policing The Dream, Newsarama, March 14, 2005
Straczynski's Dream Becomes Reality, IGN, March 28, 2005

2005 comics debuts
Comics by J. Michael Straczynski
Icon Comics titles